Veer Vikram Singh, also known as "Prince", is an Indian politician of the Bharatiya Janata Party and a member of the 17th Uttar Pradesh Legislative Assembly. His native village is Dhabora Simra,Tehsil Tilhar Shahjahanpur. He is considered one of the youngest MLAs of Uttar Pradesh represented in 17th Legislative Assembly.

Political career
Veer Vikram Singh, also known as "Prince", was elected to the 17th Legislative Assembly of Uttar Pradesh in 2017 from the Katra constituency and is one of the youngest members representing the Legislative assembly of the Bharatiya Janata Party.

Early life
Singh was educated at Mumuksh Ashram in Shahjahanpur and then at the Scindia School at Fort Gwalior. From there he progressed to a B. Com. degree at the University of Delhi and to an MBA at business school. He did further study in Belgium and France, and he holds an LLB degree from SS College Shahjahanpur.

Posts held

References

Further reading
http://www.livehindustan.com/news/bareilly/article1-mla-prince-promise-to-complete-all-promise-in-time-786285.html

Uttar Pradesh MLAs 2017–2022
Bharatiya Janata Party politicians from Uttar Pradesh
Living people
Year of birth missing (living people)
Uttar Pradesh MLAs 2022–2027